Albert Charles Joyce CBE (22 May 18866 October 1973) was Commonwealth Auditor-General of Australia from 1946 to 1951.

Biography
Albert Charles Joyce was born on 22 May 1886 in Melbourne, Victoria, to Albert Samuel Joyce and Ellen (née Carne). On 20 February 1908 he married Elsie Spicer and had 4 sons and two daughters. One son died in 1944 over Germany while serving with the RAAF.

Albert Joyce began working at the Auditor-General's office of the Public Service in 1903. He also worked for the PMG, the Department of Defence and the Department of the Treasury. He served as Auditor-General from 1946 to 1951.

He was a member of Rotary and the Masonic Lodge. He also became president of the Baptist Union of New South Wales.

His wife died in 1960.

He died on 6 October 1973 at Red Hill, Australian Capital Territory, ACT aged 87.

References

Australian public servants
1973 deaths
1886 births
Australian Commanders of the Order of the British Empire
Auditors
Public servants from Melbourne